Midila bordonorum is a moth in the family Crambidae. It was described by Eugene G. Munroe in 1972. It is found in Venezuela.

References

Moths described in 1972
Midilinae